"Big Man" is a song written by Bruce Belland and Glen A. Larson, and released by The Four Preps in 1958.

Chart performance
The song reached No. 5 on Billboards Top 100 Sides chart, while reaching No. 3 on Billboards chart of sides "Most Played by Jockeys", and No. 6 on Billboards chart of "Best Selling Pop Singles in Stores". The song also reached No. 2 on the United Kingdom's New Musical Express chart and No. 4 on Canada's CHUM Hit Parade.

Covers by other artists
Herman's Hermits

References

1958 songs
1958 singles
Capitol Records singles
The Four Preps songs
Songs written by Bruce Belland
Songs written by Glen A. Larson